The Navajo Trail is a 1945 American Western film directed by Howard Bretherton and written by Frank H. Young. This is the fourteenth film in the "Marshal Nevada Jack McKenzie" series, and stars Johnny Mack Brown as Jack McKenzie and Raymond Hatton as his sidekick Sandy Hopkins, with Jennifer Holt, Riley Hill, Edmund Cobb and Ray Bennett. The film was released on January 15, 1945, by Monogram Pictures.

Cast           
Johnny Mack Brown as Nevada Jack McKenzie / Rocky Saunders
Raymond Hatton as Sandy Hopkins
Jennifer Holt as Mary Trevor
Riley Hill as Paul Mason
Edmund Cobb as Jack Farr
Ray Bennett as Slim Ramsey 
Charles King as Red 
Tom Quinn as Tober
Mary MacLaren as Stella Ramsey
Bud Osborne as Bert 
Earl Crawford as Joe 
Johnny Carpenter as Steve 
Jim Hood as Rusty Hanover 
Jasper Palmer as Sgt. Trevor

References

External links

American Western (genre) films
1945 Western (genre) films
Monogram Pictures films
Films directed by Howard Bretherton
American black-and-white films
1940s American films
1940s English-language films